Zahir Shah (born 23 December 1989) is a Pakistani male squash player. He achieved his highest career ranking of 171 in March 2017.

References 

1989 births
Living people
Pakistani male squash players
Sportspeople from Peshawar
Racket sportspeople from Peshawar